Time of My Life is an Australian 8-part documentary series aired on the Seven Network's digital channel 7TWO on 5 October 2013 until 23 November 2013 at Saturday 6.30pm.

7two original programming
2010s Australian documentary television series
2013 Australian television series debuts
2013 Australian television series endings
English-language television shows